The second season of The Face premiered on March 5, 2014 on Oxygen. The season followed three supermodel coaches as they competed with each other to find 'the face' of Frédéric Fekkai's hair care brand by the same name.

Model coaches Coco Rocha and Karolína Kurková both opted to leave the show for season two. They were replaced by Anne Vyalitsyna and Lydia Hearst. Nigel Barker also joined to serve as the host for season two. The winner of the competition was 20-year-old Tiana Zarlin from San Diego, California.

Casting process
For season two, contestants had to be aged 18 as of September 1, 2013. After pre-registering themselves online, applicants had to attend an open casting call at Chelsea Studios in New York City on July 21, 2013. They could also apply online by submitting a home video. The deadline for all applications was 22 July.

Contestants
(Ages stated are at the start of filming)

Episodes

Episode 1: Let the Face Begin
First aired March 5, 2014

The season kicks off as the twelve finalists meet their mentors Anne Vyalitsyna, Lydia Hearst, and Naomi Campbell in Bryant Park, where they are divided into three teams of four. Later, they must pose together behind a storefront window in a campaign for Juicy Couture. The winning team is revealed, and one of the model hopefuls has her dreams cut short.

 Winning coach and team: Naomi Campbell 
 Bottom two: Isabelle Bianchi & Ray Clanton
 Eliminated: Isabelle Bianchi
 Special Guests: Matthew Ellenberger

Episode 2: Bare Your New Look
First aired March 12, 2014

The aspiring models receive make overs at the Frédéric Fekkai salon. For the campaign, the models must pose nude in a shoot for the brand's website. Drama escalates after Naomi calls out one of her models, throwing her into conflict with the rest of the girls. After her team is revealed to be the winner of the campaign, Naomi becomes critical of the two models the losing mentors have chosen to send into the elimination room.

 Winning coach and team: Naomi Campbell  
 Bottom two:  Khadisha Gaye & Nakisha Bromfield
 Eliminated: Nakisha Bromfield

Episode 3: Runway Dinner Party
First aired March 12, 2014

Naomi attacks Anne and Lydia for choosing their only black models to be put on the chopping block after the racial controversy in the previous episode. The girls later meet Tyson Beckford for a catwalk lesson challenge in preparation for an upcoming runway show. For the campaign, the models must walk on top of a banquet table catwalk in Pamella Roland gowns. The episode culminates in the emotional breakdown of one of the contestants, and for the first time ever, one of the coaches barges into the elimination room mid-ceremony.

 Winning coach and team: Anne Vyalitsyna
 Bottom two: Kira Dikhtyar  & Ray Clanton
 Eliminated: Kira Dikhtyar
 Special Guests: Pamella Roland, Tyson Beckford

Episode 4: Sell, Sell, Sell!
First aired March 26, 2014

The test shoots are thrown out the window as the models are told that they will have to take on the rest of the campaigns unprepared. After the news are revealed the contestants are introduced to their client for the campaign, the CEO of lifestyle brand Alex and Ani, Giovanni Feroce. The goal for the shoot is to create a thirty-second commercial in just one take. Back in the loft, a feud takes place between two of the models.

 Winning coach and team: Anne Vyalitsyna
 Bottom two: Alana Duval  & Allison Millar
 Eliminated: Alana Duval
 Special Guests: Giovanni Feroce

Episode 5: Going Viral
First aired April 2, 2014

The teams must once again take part in a video campaign, much to the dismay of team Lydia's Allison. The goal is to create a thirty-second viral video with a dance routine that will generate buzz towards the featured brand, Libeskind Berlin. Karen Elson makes a guest appearance to help the models create the best commercial possible. Team Anne V snags their third consecutive win, and Anne must once again decide the fate of one of the hopefuls.

 Winning coach and team: Anne Vyalitsyna
 Bottom two: Allison Millar & Felisa Wiley 
 Eliminated: Allison Millar
 Special Guests: Karen Elson, Natalie Sears

Episode 6: Just One of the Boys
First aired April 9, 2014

Nigel Barker introduces the models to drag superstar RuPaul, who teaches the girls about gender role reversal. For the campaign, the mentors pose in front of the camera with their models for a photo shoot that will be featured on Elle.com's website. Team Anne's winning streak finally comes to a halt, and in the elimination room, one of the contestants wishes she could switch teams.

 Winning coach and team: Naomi Campbell 
 Bottom two: Khadisha Gaye & Amanda Gullickson
 Eliminated: Khadisha Gaye
 Special Guests: Joe Zee, RuPaul Andre Charles

Episode 7: Male Bonding
First aired April 16, 2014

The models pose intimately with complete strangers, in a sexy lingerie campaign for Fleur du Mal. They'll need to find chemistry with their male models in order to stay in the competition. Lydia steps up her game with a more forceful technique.

 Winning coach and team: Lydia Hearst
 Bottom two: Felisa Wiley &  Sharon Gallardo 
 Eliminated: Sharon Gallardo
 Featured Photographer: Hao Zeng
 Special Guests: Jennifer Zuccarini

Episode 8: Diamonds Are a Model's Best Friend
First aired April 23, 2014

The models shoot a jewelry commercial for Chopard. They must remain composed while running in 10 inch heels and dressed in restrictive dresses made by Lady Gaga's favorite designer, Iris Van Herpen. Afiya and Naomi don't see eye to eye.

 Winning coach and team: Naomi Campbell 
 Bottom two: Amanda Gullickson & Tiana Zarlin  
 Eliminated: Amanda Gullickson
 Featured Director: Roberto Serrini
 Special Guests: Anne Slowey, Marc Hruschka

Episode 9: Press Your Luck
First aired April 30, 2014

The models' composure is tested when they deliver a speech in front of a room full of press. When something catches the models off guard, one loses face with her coach and has a hard time recovering.

 Winning coach and team: Anne Vyalitsyna 
 Bottom two: Felisa Wiley & Ray Clanton
 Quit: Felisa Wiley
 Special Guests: Alyssa Montemurro, Chandra Coleman Harris, Denise Davila, Frédéric Fekkai, Jennifer Jackson, Jennifer Peros, JP Kuehlwein, Leah Chernikoff, Perez Hilton, Samantha Yanks

Episode 10: Who Will Be the Face
First aired May 7, 2014

The remaining models must dazzle Frederic Fekkai in three of the most difficult challenges yet. In the end, only one will become a spokesperson and ambassador for Frédéric Fekkai's 2014 national ad campaign and win a coveted spread in the July issue of Elle.

 Final three: Afiya Bennett, Ray Clanton & Tiana Zarlin
 The Face of Frédéric Fekkai: Tiana Zarlin
 Winning coach and team:  Anne Vyalitsyna
 Featured Photographer: Gilles Bensimon
 Special Guests: Anne Slowey, Frédéric Fekkai, Roberta Myers, Tyson Beckford

Summaries

Elimination table

 The contestant was part of the winning team for the episode.
 The contestant was at risk of elimination.
 The contestant was eliminated from the competition.
 The contestant withdrew from the competition.
 The contestant was a Runner-Up.
 The contestant won The Face.

 During the first segment of episode 1, the final twelve contestants were divided into their respective teams. The first campaign and resulting elimination also took place this episode.
 In episode 5, team Anne won the campaign. Sharon won an individual prize for being the best performer of the campaign.
 In episode 9, Felisa quit while she was in the bottom two with Ray before Anne had made her decision.

Campaigns
 Episode 1: Juicy Couture in a storefront window
 Episode 2: Nude photo shoot for Frédéric Fekkai
 Episode 3: Pamella Roland runway show
 Episode 4: Alex and Ani commercials
 Episode 5: Viral videos for Liebeskind Berlin
 Episode 6: Gender reversal for Elle.com
 Episode 7: Fleur du Mal lingerie with male models
 Episode 8: Futuristic Chopard diamonds adverts
 Episode 9: Press conference for Frédéric Fekkai's new Hair Fragrance Mist; Q&A with Perez Hilton
 Episode 10: Go-sees with Frédéric Fekkai; beauty shots by Gilles Bensimon

References

External links

United States, 2
2014 American television seasons